Kuujjuarapik is an Inuit reserved land (Category I land for Inuit) in Nunavik, in northern Quebec.  Like all Inuit reserved lands in Quebec, it has no resident population (as of the Canada 2011 Census and previous censuses) and has a counterpart northern village of the same name: Kuujjuarapik.

Unlike most other Inuit reserved lands, however, the Inuit reserved land of Kuujjuarapik is not adjacent to the northern village of the same name; rather, it is located considerably farther north and in fact borders on the Inuit reserved land of Umiujaq.

References

Inuit reserved lands in Quebec